Stanage Edge, or simply Stanage (from "stone edge") is a gritstone escarpment in the Peak District, England, famous as a location for climbing. It lies a couple of miles to the north of Hathersage, and the northern part of the edge forms the border between the High Peak of Derbyshire and Sheffield in South Yorkshire. Areas of Stanage were quarried in the past to produce grindstones, and some can still be seen on the hillside—carved, but never removed.

Features
A paved packhorse road ran along the top of the edge, and remains of it can be seen, as can remains of the Long Causeway, once thought to be a Roman road which works its way over the edge on its route from Templeborough to Brough-on-Noe, crossing Hallam Moor and passing Stanedge Pole (note the slightly different spelling), an ancient waymarker on the route to Sheffield. Some cairns along the top are even older, and there is a well-known cave in the cliff known as Robin Hood's Cave. More recent features include early 20th-century drinking basins, designed to collect pure rainwater for grouse to drink.

During the construction of the Rivelin tunnel a sighting tower was constructed on the edge to assist in surveying the route of the tunnel. All that remains of the tower is a heap of stones at Ordnance Survey grid reference .

Sport

Rock climbing

Stanage's naturally weathered Millstone Grit face is now known as a highly popular location for rock climbing in the Peak District. The edge runs three miles north from the Cowper Stone to Stanage End. It is the northernmost of an almost continuous line of cliffs, including Burbage Rocks, Froggatt Edge, Curbar Edge, Baslow Edge and Birchen Edge. The Cowper Stone is a block of gritstone at the most southerly point of Stanage. Set alone a few hundred metres from the last buttress of the main crag, it is a large boulder with distinctive rounded breaks running across it. It is the scene of some classic hard-grit routes of the 1980s first climbed by protagonists such as Johnny Dawes and John Allen. The Edge was notably omitted from the first rock climbing guidebook to the Peak District, Some Gritstone Climbs by John Laycock, published in 1913, due to the then severe access restrictions to the land.  It has subsequently been featured regularly in over a century of regular climbing guidebooks, which document the growth in the number of routes and the rise in climbing standards.

Although the edge reaches only 25 metres in height it is one of the most famous UK climbing venues: aside from having a multitude of routes close to a major population centre, it is home to the route Right Unconquerable (HVS 5a), which, when first climbed by Joe Brown in 1949, was considered a milestone achievement in British climbing. In spite of its height, the edge is home to the longest recorded rock route in the United Kingdom; the 5000m Girdle Traverse, completed by Ron Fawcett in 1992 and graded "E5 6b(ish)".

Running
Stanage is a magnet for walkers and runners. The 19 September 2021 edition of the event was won in a time of 40m 51s by Michael Kenyon of Dronfield Running Club; there were 224 finishers.

In popular culture
The location has featured in films and television series, most notably in the 2005 film Pride and Prejudice during a scene Elizabeth Bennet (portrayed by Keira Knightley) is seen facing the horizon from the Edge.

Gallery

See also
 Standedge, a moorland escarpment and Pennine crossing point

References

Hills and edges of South Yorkshire
Mountains and hills of Derbyshire
Mountains and hills of the Peak District
Climbing areas of England
Geography of Sheffield
Escarpments of England